Rudolf Kruspel (born 6 October 1950) is an Austrian diver. He competed in two events at the 1972 Summer Olympics.

References

1950 births
Living people
Austrian male divers
Olympic divers of Austria
Divers at the 1972 Summer Olympics
Place of birth missing (living people)